The Chase's Theater and Riggs Building, also known as the Keith-Albee Theater and the Keith-Albee Building, was a historic building located at 1426 G Street and 615-627 15th Street, Northwest, Washington, D.C., in the city's Downtown area.

History

The Beaux-Arts theater was originally designed by Jules Henri de Sibour, and built in 1912, for Plimpston B. Chase. He sold the theater to B.F. Keith in 1913.
It was a part of the B.F. Keith vaudeville circuit, which became a part of the Keith-Albee-Orpheum chain, and then RKO Pictures. William Howard Taft attended the opening in 1912, and Woodrow Wilson regularly attended.
Entertainers included: Will Rogers, Eddie Cantor, Rudy Vallée, Laurel and Hardy, and ZaSu Pitts.

In 1956, RKO sold the building, to Morris Cafritz for $1.55 million. In 1959, he offered to sell the building to the city as a performing arts center, but the city would not assume the $1.5 million mortgage.
The movie theater closed in 1978; it was placed on the National Register of Historic Places.

In March 1978, the United States Commission of Fine Arts recommended saving the facade of the Keith-Albee Theater and National Metropolitan Bank.

In 1979, the D.C. Superior Court halted demolition of the Keith Albee building, but then allowed demolition of the interior. The developer said he would preserve the historic facade of the Keith-Albee theater building, if he could demolish Rhodes' Tavern.

It is now the Metropolitan Square office building.

See also
 National Register of Historic Places listings in the District of Columbia
 Theater in Washington D.C.

References

External links 

 http://www.streetsofwashington.com/2010/05/vaudeville-and-other-high-drama-at-15th.html
 http://www.wikimapia.org/4468154/Metropolitan-Square

Commercial buildings on the National Register of Historic Places in Washington, D.C.
Art Deco architecture in Washington, D.C.
Theatres in Washington, D.C.
Theatres completed in 1938
Theatres on the National Register of Historic Places in Washington, D.C.